Julia Tobin (born 1955 in Wallsend, Newcastle upon Tyne) is an English actress from Newcastle upon Tyne, and is best known for playing Brenda Hope in the comedy drama series Auf Wiedersehen, Pet and Joan of Arc in the music video by Orchestral Manoeuvres in the Dark. She is the only actress to appear in every series of Auf Wiedersehen, Pet.

Personal life

Tobin is the daughter of Stella (née Wright), and James Tobin. Tobin has two older siblings, James Jr. and Maureen, and a younger brother, Christopher Tobin.
Tobin is married to Christopher Dobbins and still lives in Newcastle upon Tyne.

Other notable TV appearances include an episode of Spender, The Bill and the Auf Wiedersehen, Pet episode of the documentary series Drama Connections.

External links
 

Living people
Actresses from Newcastle upon Tyne
English television actresses
1955 births
20th-century English actresses
21st-century English actresses